Kirsten Flipkens and Elise Mertens were the defending champions, but chose not to participate.

Sorana Cîrstea and Andreea Mitu won the title, defeating Veronika Kudermetova and Galina Voskoboeva in the final, 1–6, 6–2, [10–8].

Seeds

Draw

Draw

References

External links
Main Draw

Ladies Open Lugano - Doubles
2019 Doubles
Lugano